Debila District is a district of El Oued Province, Algeria. As of the 2008 census, it has a population of 47,913.

Communes

Debila District consists of two communes:
Debila
Hassani Abdelkrim

References

Districts of El Oued Province